Said Karimulla Khalili (  
(born 2 September 1998) is a Russian-Afghan biathlete.

He competed at the Biathlon World Championships 2021, winning a bronze medal in the relay event.

Biathlon results

Olympic Games
1 medal (1 bronze)

World Championships
1 medal (1 bronze)

References

External links

1998 births
Living people
Russian male biathletes
Russian people of Afghan descent
People from Sergiyev Posad
Biathletes at the 2016 Winter Youth Olympics
Biathlon World Championships medalists
Biathletes at the 2022 Winter Olympics
Olympic biathletes of Russia
Medalists at the 2022 Winter Olympics
Olympic medalists in biathlon
Olympic bronze medalists for the Russian Olympic Committee athletes
Sportspeople from Moscow Oblast